The four provincial governments of Pakistan administer the four provinces of Pakistan. There is also a federal capital territory and two disputed regions which have similar governments but with some differences. The head of each province is a non-executive Governor appointed by the President. The Governors play a similar role, at the provincial level, as the President does at the federal level. Each province has a directly elected unicameral legislature (provincial assembly), with members elected for five-year terms. Each provincial assembly elects a Chief Minister, who then selects a cabinet of ministers from amongst the members of the Provincial Assembly. Each province also has a High Court, which forms part  of the superior judiciary.

Provincial governments
Government of Balochistan
Chief Minister of Balochistan
Provincial Assembly of Balochistan
Balochistan High Court
Government of Khyber Pakhtunkhwa
Chief Minister of Khyber Pakhtunkhwa
Provincial Assembly of Khyber Pakhtunkhwa
Peshawar High Court
Government of Punjab
Chief Minister of Punjab
Provincial Assembly of the Punjab
Lahore High Court
Government of Sindh
Chief Minister of Sindh
Provincial Assembly of Sindh
Sindh High Court

Former Provincial Government
 Provincial Government of East Pakistan
Chief Minister of East Pakistan
East Pakistan Provincial Assembly
Dhaka High Court

Territorial/associated governments
Government of Islamabad Capital Territory
Islamabad High Court
Government of Azad Kashmir
President of Azad Kashmir
Prime Minister of Azad Kashmir
Azad Kashmir Legislative Assembly
Supreme Court of Azad Kashmir
Government of Gilgit-Baltistan
Chief Minister of Gilgit-Baltistan
Assembly of Gilgit-Baltistan
Supreme Appellate Court Gilgit-Baltistan
South Punjab Civil Secretariat
Additional Chief Secretary
Additional IG Police

References

Provincial Governments of Pakistan
Pakistan
Pakistan politics-related lists